Gladwyn Murray Childs (29 December 1896 – July 1975) was an American minister, missionary and anthropologist.

Early life
He was born in Endeavor, Wisconsin on 29 December 1896.  He received his bachelor's degree from Pomona College, a BD and MA from Union Theological Seminary in the City of New York, where he knew William Sloane Coffin.  He obtained a PhD in anthropology from Columbia University.

Career
Childs was a striking man, being 6' 4" tall.  Together with his wife, Margaret, he worked as a missionary from 1925 to the early 1960s for the United Church Board for World Ministries and the American Board of Commissioners for Foreign Missions in Angola.  He was the principal of a mission school, the Currie Institute.

Later life
After retirement, he worked for the World Council of Churches in Lisbon, but sought to return to Angola to work on a prehistoric project.   Childs also worked with his uncle, Merlin Ennis, a researcher of folk tales, on Umbundu folktales.

Personal life
He married Margaret (born Marguerite) Pfaffli (5 November 1902 – January 1986) in her home town of Lausanne, Switzerland on 14 February 1925.  Their daughter, Elaine Childs-Gowell (died 2006) was a therapist, anthropologist and author.

Publications
'The Ovimbundu of Angola' Chicago: Field Museum of Natural History, 1934.

'Umbundu Kinship and Character: Being a Description of Social Structure and Individual Development of the Ovimbundu'. .  Published by: Oxford University Press, 1949

'The Kingdom of Wambu (Huambo): A Tentative Chronology' in The Journal of African History, Vol. 5, No. 3 (1964), pp. 367–379, Published by: Cambridge University Press

References
 Biography
Daughter's obituary

1896 births
1975 deaths
Academics from Wisconsin
American Methodist missionaries
Female Christian missionaries
Pomona College alumni
Union Theological Seminary (New York City) alumni
Methodist missionaries in Angola
People from Marquette County, Wisconsin
20th-century American anthropologists